Eighth Street Bridge may refer to:
Eighth Street Bridge (Allegheny River)
Albertus L. Meyers Bridge, also known as Eighth Street Bridge, in Allentown, Pennsylvania
Eighth Street Bridge (Passaic River)
Eighth Street Bridge (Sioux Falls, South Dakota), listed on the National Register of Historic Places